Daniel Mateusz Pliński (born 10 December 1978) is a Polish professional volleyball coach and former player. He was a member of the Poland national team from 2005 to 2010. A participant in the Olympic Games Beijing 2008, silver medallist at the 2006 World Championship, and the 2009 European Champion. He is the current head coach of the Polish PlusLiga team, PSG Stal Nysa.

Personal life
Daniel Pliński was born in Puck. He has three brothers Piotr, Wiesław, Wojciech and two sisters – Wioleta and Iwona. On 24 September 2004, he married Marta. They have two daughters – Julia (born 10 April 2006) and Lena (born 2012).

Career
Pliński is a three–time Polish Champion in beach volleyball – 2002, 2003, 2004.

Clubs
He was a player of PGE Skra Bełchatów for seven years. With this team, he won, among others: five titles of Polish Champion (2008, 2009, 2010, 2011, 2014), three Polish Cups (2009, 2011, 2012), silver and bronze medal of the CEV Champions League. On 9 May 2014, it was announced that Pliński will join Cerrad Czarni Radom.

He retired from volleyball on 24 May 2018.

National team
Pliński was a member of the Polish national team which won a gold medal at the 2009 European Championship held in Turkey. On 14 September 2009, he was awarded the Knight's Cross of Polonia Restituta. The Order was conferred on the following day by the Prime Minister of Poland, Donald Tusk.

Honours

Clubs
 CEV Champions League
  2011/2012 – with PGE Skra Bełchatów

 FIVB Club World Championship
  Doha 2009 – with PGE Skra Bełchatów
  Doha 2010 – with PGE Skra Bełchatów

 National championships
 2002/2003  Polish Cup, with Polska Energia Sosnowiec
 2003/2004  Polish Cup, with Polska Energia Sosnowiec
 2007/2008  Polish Championship, with PGE Skra Bełchatów
 2008/2009  Polish Cup, with PGE Skra Bełchatów
 2008/2009  Polish Championship, with PGE Skra Bełchatów
 2009/2010  Polish Championship, with PGE Skra Bełchatów
 2010/2011  Polish Cup, with PGE Skra Bełchatów
 2010/2011  Polish Championship, with PGE Skra Bełchatów
 2011/2012  Polish Cup, with PGE Skra Bełchatów
 2013/2014  Polish Championship, with PGE Skra Bełchatów

State awards
 2006:  Gold Cross of Merit
 2009:  Knight's Cross of Polonia Restituta

References

External links

 
 
 Player profile at PlusLiga.pl 
 
 Coach/Player profile at Volleybox.net

1978 births
Living people
People from Puck, Poland
Sportspeople from Pomeranian Voivodeship
Polish men's volleyball players
Polish volleyball coaches
Olympic volleyball players of Poland
Volleyball players at the 2008 Summer Olympics
Recipients of the Gold Cross of Merit (Poland)
Knights of the Order of Polonia Restituta
Jastrzębski Węgiel players
Skra Bełchatów players
Czarni Radom players
AZS Olsztyn players
Stal Nysa coaches
Middle blockers